Dear Friend is a Philippine television drama anthology broadcast by GMA Network. Hosted by Jolina Magdangal and Marvin Agustin, it premiered on July 20, 2008. The show concluded on May 16, 2010 with a total of 92 episodes. It was replaced by Love Bug in its timeslot.

First season

Guest cast

Jennica Garcia
Mart Escudero
Aljur Abrenica
Kris Bernal
Dennis Trillo
Antoinette Taus
Paolo Contis
Heart Evangelista
Nadine Samonte
Sheena Halili
Sunshine Dizon
Mark Anthony Fernandez
Ehra Madrigal
Michelle Madrigal
Mark Herras
Jennylyn Mercado
Ryza Cenon
JC de Vera
Diana Zubiri
Luis Alandy

Second season

Bulong ng Puso
Cast and characters
Jennica Garcia as Toni
Mart Escudero as Mateo
Rich Asuncion as Amor
Dion Ignacio as Patrick
Rainier Castillo as
Daniel Fernando as Father of Toni

Magkaribal
Cast and characters
Katrina Halili as Kim
Jewel Mische as Cindy
Alfred Vargas as Ron
JC Tiuseco as Kiko

Igorota
Cast
Glaiza de Castro
Patrick Garcia
Polo Ravales

Madrasta

Bakasyonistas

Kay Tagal Kitang Hinintay

Karibal

Three Bachelors

Special

My Christmas List

Almost A Love Story

My Stalking Heart

Tisay

Ratings
According to AGB Nielsen Philippines' Mega Manila household television ratings, the final episode of Dear Friend scored a 10.5% rating.

References

External links
 

2008 Philippine television series debuts
2010 Philippine television series endings
Filipino-language television shows
GMA Network original programming
Philippine anthology television series